Luis García Fernández (born 6 February 1981) is a Spanish former professional footballer, and the current manager of CF Damm's under-19 team. Mainly a striker, he could also operate as a winger.

Over nine seasons, he amassed La Liga totals of 329 matches and 73 goals, mainly with Espanyol with whom he won one Copa del Rey and reached the 2007 UEFA Cup Final. He also spent five in years in Belgium, at the service of Eupen.

Club career

Real Madrid and early years
García was born in Oviedo, Asturias. After representing three clubs as a youth he began his senior career with his last one, Real Madrid, first appearing with its C team then progressing in 2001 to Castilla in the third division. He played his first and only game for the main squad in the Copa del Rey, away to Terrassa FC.

Released by Madrid in 2003, García joined Real Murcia, making his La Liga debut on 31 August and scoring a penalty in a 1–1 away draw against RC Celta de Vigo. He finished his debut season with 11 goals as he appeared in all the matches, although the side would be relegated; on 16 May 2004, he netted twice in a 2–1 fruitless home win over his former employee.

Espanyol
The following season, García produced similar numbers at RCD Mallorca, who barely avoided relegation after ranking 17th and, in the 2005 off-season, signed a five-year contract with RCD Espanyol, playing 49 games overall in his first season and adding 14 goals, including a brace in the 2006 Spanish Cup final, a 4–1 defeat of Real Zaragoza. In the ensuing summer, he extended his link until 2012.

García, forming a formidable attacking partnership at the Catalans with youth graduate Raúl Tamudo (the pair combined for 67 league goals from 2005 to 2008), contributed five goals during their 2006–07 runner-up run in the UEFA Cup, including a hat-trick in a 23 November 2006 group stage 6–2 home win against SV Zulte-Waregem. However, in the May final, he missed his penalty shootout attempt in a final loss to fellow league side Sevilla FC.

García was an everpresent figure for Espanyol in the following three campaigns, never making less than 36 league appearances and scoring an average of seven goals, 13 alone in 2007–08. After the arrival in January 2010 of Argentine Dani Osvaldo, he operated almost exclusively as a winger.

Zaragoza
On 31 August 2011 – the very last day of the summer transfer window – 30-year-old García signed a three-year contract with Zaragoza. On 18 September, he scored twice against his former team and also missed a penalty kick in a 2–1 home victory. He would, however, only manage two in the other 33 matches of the season he appeared in (in a total of 2,297 minutes of action), with the Aragonese again barely avoiding top-flight relegation.

García arrived to Monterrey on 5 July 2012 accompanied by his agent, to kickstart negotiations with Liga MX side Tigres UANL. On 15 September he scored twice against Cruz Azul for a 2–0 win at the Estadio Universitario and, in two games in March of the following year, contributed one goal each in 2–1 wins over San Luis F.C. and Puebla FC.

Eupen
In July 2014, García signed a two-year contract with Belgian Second Division team K.A.S. Eupen, joining a host of compatriots including manager Tintín Márquez.

International career
After a remarkable 2006–07 with Espanyol, García got his first callup for Spain, under manager Luis Aragonés, appearing in an UEFA Euro 2008 qualifier against Latvia in Riga on 2 June 2007.

Career statistics

Club

Honours
Espanyol
Copa del Rey: 2005–06
UEFA Cup runner-up: 2006–07

References

External links

 
 
 
 

1981 births
Living people
Footballers from Oviedo
Spanish footballers
Association football forwards
La Liga players
Segunda División players
Segunda División B players
Tercera División players
Real Madrid C footballers
Real Madrid Castilla footballers
Real Madrid CF players
Real Murcia players
RCD Mallorca players
RCD Espanyol footballers
Real Zaragoza players
Liga MX players
Tigres UANL footballers
Belgian Pro League players
Challenger Pro League players
K.A.S. Eupen players
Spain international footballers
Spanish expatriate footballers
Expatriate footballers in Mexico
Expatriate footballers in Belgium
Spanish expatriate sportspeople in Mexico
Spanish expatriate sportspeople in Belgium